Bhupendra Kainthola (born March 15, 1966), Indian Information Service (IIS) officer, is the current Director general (East Zone) of the Press Information Bureau (PIB).

Previous posts 
Director, Film and Television Institute of India
Additional Director General, Doordarshan (News)
Director, Directorate of Advertising and Visual Publicity (DAVP)
Director, National Film Awards
Director, Indian Panorama
Director, Press Information Bureau (PIB)

See also 
Press Information Bureau
Film and Television Institute of India

References

External links 

1966 births
Living people
Indian civil servants